Rixton-with-Glazebrook is a civil parish in the Borough of Warrington, Cheshire, England. Historically part of Lancashire, it lies to the east of Warrington and borders Cadishead, and is largely farmland. It has a railway station at Glazebrook and is served by buses along the A57 road. The parish was originally a township within Warrington parish before becoming a separate parish in 1866. It was part of the Warrington Poor Law Union and, from 1894, Warrington Rural District, and the District of Warrington from 1974.

According to the 2011 Census, Rixton-with-Glazebrook parish had a population of 1,960.

Glazebrook has a small housing estate, a post office and Glazebrook railway station. The station, on the Liverpool to Manchester southern route, marks the westernmost boundary of the Transport for Greater Manchester area.

The village lies around 4 miles east of Warrington town centre and is bounded by Cadishead to the east and Culcheth to the north.

Etymology
The name "Rixton" derives from the personal name "Ric" and tun, which is Old English for a homestead or settlement. "Glazebrook" derives from Brittonic glas, which can mean either a river, or else "blue" or "green or blue", and brook, from Old English "brōc", meaning a small stream.

Notable people
Neil McArthur (born 1956/57), businessman

See also

Listed buildings in Rixton-with-Glazebrook

Notes and references

External links

Rixton-with-Glazebrook website

Warrington
Civil parishes in Warrington